Atractocarpus is a genus of flowering plants in the family Rubiaceae. Its members are commonly known as native gardenias in Australia. The genus name is derived from the Ancient Greek terms atractos "spindle", and karpos "fruit", from the spindle-shaped fruit of the type species.

Taxonomy
Defined by botanists Rudolf Schlechter and Kurt Krause in 1908, the type species is Atractocarpus  bracteatus, which is found only on New Caledonia. Subsequently, several other species were described from New Caledonia.

Meanwhile, the genera Randia and Gardenia had been used as wastebasket taxa, where many species that had been difficult to place had been placed by default.

Puttock also proposed that the genera Sukunia, Trukia, Neofranciella, and Sulitia (the last two consisting of once species each) be sunk into Atractocarpus. The resulting genus now contains around forty species, with seven found in Australia, and others in the Federated States of Micronesia, the Philippines, New Guinea, the Solomon Islands, Vanuatu, New Caledonia, Fiji, Tonga, and east to Tahiti. All species are found in a type of lowland rainforest known as mesophyll vine forests, as well as swamp forests and vine thickets.

Species
The following 40 species are accepted by Plants of the World Online 

 Atractocarpus aragoensis 
 Atractocarpus artensis 
 Atractocarpus baladicus 
 Atractocarpus benthamianus 
 Atractocarpus bracteatus 
 Atractocarpus brandzeanus 
 Atractocarpus carolinensis 
 Atractocarpus chartaceus 
 Atractocarpus colnettianus 
 Atractocarpus confertus 
 Atractocarpus crosbyi 
 Atractocarpus cucumicarpus 
 Atractocarpus decorus 
 Atractocarpus deplanchei 
 Atractocarpus fitzalanii 
 Atractocarpus heterophyllus 
 Atractocarpus hirtus 
 Atractocarpus longipes 
 Atractocarpus longistipitatus 
 Atractocarpus macarthurii 
 Atractocarpus merikin 
 Atractocarpus mollis 
 Atractocarpus ngoyensis 
 Atractocarpus nigricans 
 Atractocarpus oblongus 
 Atractocarpus obscurinervius 
 Atractocarpus pancherianus 
 Atractocarpus pentagonioides 
 Atractocarpus platixylon 
 Atractocarpus pseudoterminalis 
 Atractocarpus pterocarpon 
 Atractocarpus rotundifolius 
 Atractocarpus sessilis 
 Atractocarpus sezitat 
 Atractocarpus simulans 
 Atractocarpus stipularis 
 Atractocarpus tahitiensis 
 Atractocarpus tenuiflorus 
 Atractocarpus vaginatus 
 Atractocarpus versteegii

References

External links
World Checklist of Rubiaceae
Flickriver interesting photos tagged as Atractocarpus (several species)

 
Rubiaceae genera
Flora of New Guinea
Flora of New Caledonia
Flora of the Philippines
Flora of the Pacific
Flora of Norfolk Island
Flora of Queensland
Flora of New South Wales